Summer Holiday is the second special Korean extended play by South Korean girl group Dreamcatcher. It was released on July 30, 2021, by Dreamcatcher Company. Summer Holiday features six tracks including the lead single "BEcause", and is available in four versions: "G", "I", "F" and "T".

Background and promotion
On July 30, Dreamcatcher made their comeback with the special EP Summer Holiday and its lead single "BEcause".

Composition

Songs
The lead single "BEcause" is a nu metal song with a strong rock sound and hip hop elements. It conveys the story of the EP implicitly, with a deep and strong will to move forward once again towards a true utopia.

Soompi described "BEcause" as "Expresses a story of obsession caused by excessive love. With a melody made up of pizzicato sounds, the song contains Dreamcatcher’s signature dark vibe."

Track listing

Charts

Weekly charts

Year-end charts

Release history

References

2021 EPs
Dreamcatcher (group) albums
Genie Music EPs
Korean-language EPs